Auguste François Le Jolis (1 December 1823, Cherbourg - 20 August 1904, Cherbourg) was a French merchant, judge and botanist.

He is largely known for investigations of cryptogams (algae, hepatics, mosses) found in the department of Manche.

The algae genus Lejolisia (family Wrangeliaceae) was named after Le Jolis by Jean-Baptiste Édouard Bornet (1828-1911).

Selected writings 
 Observations sur quelques plantes rares découvertes aux environs de Cherbourg, 1847 - Observations of some rare plants discovered in the environs of Cherbourg.
 Lichens des environs de Cherbourg, 1859 - Lichens in the environs of Cherbourg.
 Plantes vasculaires des environs de Cherbourg, 1860 - Vascular plants in the environs of Cherbourg.
 Liste des algues marines de Cherbourg, 1863 - List of marine algae of Cherbourg.
  De la rédaction des flores locales au point de vue de la géographie botanique, 1874 - On the drafting of local floras from the point of view of botanical geography.

References 
 Memoirs and proceedings of the Manchester Literary ..., Volume 49 by Manchester Literary and Philosophical Society (biography)

19th-century French botanists
French phycologists
Bryologists
1823 births
1904 deaths
People from Cherbourg-Octeville